Lee In-sung (born July 28, 1996) is a South Korean actor. He began his entertainment career as a child actor, notably in the comedy film Cracked Eggs and Noodles and the third season of sitcom Hello Franceska (both in 2005).

Filmography

Film

Television series

References

External links 
 Lee In-sung Fan Cafe at Daum 
 
 
 

1996 births
Living people
South Korean male television actors
South Korean male film actors
South Korean male child actors